Poplar Branch is a  long 1st order tributary to Mill Creek in Pittsylvania County, Virginia.

Course 
Poplar Branch rises about 1.5 miles south-southwest of Gretna Rolling Mill, Virginia and then flows generally east to join Mill Creek about 1.5 miles southeast of Gretna Rolling Mill.

Watershed 
Poplar Branch drains  of area, receives about 45.6 in/year of precipitation, has a wetness index of 410.64, and is about 49% forested.

See also 
 List of Virginia Rivers

References 

Rivers of Virginia
Rivers of Pittsylvania County, Virginia
Tributaries of the Roanoke River